Luca Ruffini (born 2 May 1997) is an Italian footballer who plays as a defender for Serie D club Calvina Sport.

References

External links
 
 
 

1997 births
Living people
A.S. Pro Piacenza 1919 players
FeralpiSalò players
U.C. AlbinoLeffe players
Serie C players
Italian footballers
Association football defenders